Streptocarpus lineatus, synonym Nodonema lineatum, is a species of plant in the family Gesneriaceae. It is found in Cameroon and Nigeria. Its natural habitat is subtropical or tropical moist lowland forests. It is threatened by habitat loss.

References

lineatus
Vulnerable plants
Taxonomy articles created by Polbot
Taxobox binomials not recognized by IUCN